The Clásico centroamericano (Central American classic) is a rivalry between the Costa Rica national football team and the Honduras national football team. The rivalry has also presented at club level for having the most successful clubs in Central America in terms of the CONCACAF Champions League.

Costa Rica in Honduras is considered one of the most important rivals, since Costa Rica’s paternity has been a clear over Honduras since the beginning of this rivalry, along with the Mexico national football team and the El Salvador national football team. Moreover, Honduras is considered in Costa Rica also as one of the most important rivals, along with the Mexico national football team and the United States men's national team. This rivalry is also accentuated by the selections that are higher amounts of account in the Copa Centroamericana trophies, most World Cup appearances and otherwise being the only teams to have achieved Aztecazo in World Cup qualifying.

These two sides are considered as the best in Central America to compete globally. The Costa Rica national team boasts the best in the area by being the only Central American national team to progress to the second round of a FIFA World Cup. This achievement has been accomplished twice, the first being at the 1990 FIFA World Cup in Italy and the 2014 FIFA World Cup in Brazil. The team has won 8 Copas Centroamericana, making Costa Rica the most successful team in the competition. Costa Rica have participated in six World Cups; 1990, 2002, 2006, 2014, 2018 and in 2022. Meanwhile the Honduras national team has never made it out of the group stage in the three World Cups the team has taken part in, España 1982, South Africa 2010, and Brazil 2014. The Honduras national team has won 4 Copas Centroamericana and one CONCACAF Gold Cup in 1981. Outside of North America the team has participated in the 2001 Copa América, the only Copa América Honduras has ever been invited to. The team won third place after knocking off Uruguay in the third place match. That year Honduras reached its highest ranking on the FIFA World Rankings at rank 20. On the other hand, while Costa Rica has managed to remain being a competitive side with a decent performance, Honduras has been marked with numerous heavy defeats in every major games, either friendlies or competitions, often by five goals up.

The rivalry can be considered very even, since the number of wins in direct clashes selections levels from the first game in 1930, has always remained relatively even (with ups and downs for both teams at different times, but always showing enough equity). The history of fighting, a total of 70 games, has 23 wins to the Costa Rica national football team, 22 wins for the Honduras national football team and 25 draws, almost bringing equity in this rivalry is demonstrated.

Origin of rivalry 

In recent years, these two nations have awakened a wide rivalry each time he approaches a commitment of this caliber. However, a review of the history reminds us that 'pique' comes from long ago, by elements not necessarily linked to the sport that moves masses.

The memory leads to that September 15, 1842 when he was shot in the Central Park of San Jose, Costa Rica, the great hero of the Federal Republic of Central America, Honduran Francisco Morazan, a leader who dominated the political and military scene Central and always wanted to turn the area into one nation. Even Morazán was the last president of this group. And in 1838, when Costa Rica had to face President Braulio Carrillo Colina, the Ticos broken relationship with the Central American Federation, which generates the beginning of a rivalry between the governments of Morazan and Carrillo.

This makes Morazan landing in Caldera (Costa Rica) in April 1842 with the enemies of Carrillo and give a coup. Honduras, who was head of state in Costa Rica in that year during the months of April and September, and together with its allies, intended to use the Costa Rican people as "cannon fodder" to reconstitute the Federation, but by force and keep his dream, as well recalled by the historian Alejandro Ugalde. It was then that Costa Ricans decide to "go down" to Morazan power and shoot him.

Despite that, Morazan fondly remembers being the initiator of the project "The Great Patriotic Central". But according to Ugalde, are the elements that unite Honduras and Costa Rica, according to the review given by history. Just remember in 2009 when the military carried to Costa Rica Honduras ousted President Manuel Zelaya.

Matches

Head to Head
 As of 16 November 2021

Other categories

Olympic teams

Under 20

Under 17

See also

References

External links
 FIFA

Honduras national football team rivalries
Costa Rica national football team
International association football rivalries
Costa Rica–Honduras relations